The 2016 Supercars Dunlop Series was an Australian motor racing competition for Supercars, staged as a support series to the Virgin Australia Supercars Championship. It was the seventeenth annual Supercars Development Series and the fifth to be contested under the "Dunlop Series" name. The season was also the first in which Holden VF Commodores and Ford FG X Falcons built to 'Car of the Future' specifications are eligible for the series, racing alongside previous generation VE Commodore and FG Falcon models.

The series was won by Garry Jacobson driving for Prodrive Racing Australia in a Ford FG X Falcon.

Teams and drivers

The following teams and drivers competed in the series.

Calendar
The 2016 calendar was released on 29 October 2015.

Series standings

Points system
Points were awarded in each race as follows.

Points standings
The series was won by Garry Jacobson driving for Prodrive Racing Australia in a Ford FG X Falcon.

See also
 2016 V8 Supercar season

References

External links
 

Supercars Development Series
Dunlop Series